EuroTalk is an educational publisher based in London, known primarily for its interactive language learning software. The company was established in 1991 by the company directors, Richard Howeson and Andrew Ashe. In 2016, EuroTalk rebranded as uTalk, and launched a new multi-platform app, also called uTalk.

Language learning
uTalk's language software was originally available on CD-ROM, DVD-ROM, and later as a USB and download. The company's range includes over 140 languages or dialects, including lesser-known languages such as Kinyarwanda, Chibemba, Greenlandic, Oromo and Cockney.

The company's products are sold worldwide through their website and distributors; 70% of their revenue comes from outside the UK. Their content is also sold under the Instant Immersion brand in the US.

uTalk has won The Queen's Award for Innovation.

Junior Language Challenge
uTalk hosts an annual competition for children under 11 across Britain called the Junior Language Challenge. The goal of the competition is to encourage children to start learning languages at a young age. It also raises money for the company's sister charity, onebillion, funding educational resources in Malawi.

In 2019, uTalk won the Threlford Cup for their work on the uTalk Junior Language Challenge.

See also
Language education
List of Language Self-Study Programs

References

External links
 EuroTalk Home Site
 uTalk Home Site
 Junior Language Challenge
 onebillion

Educational software companies
Language learning software